Ribes pallidiflorum is a species in the genus Ribes native to the far east, from northeastern China to Russia (Amur, Khabarovsk, Primorye, Sakhalin, and in the southern part of the Kamchatka Peninsula).

References

External links
 GBIF entry

pallidiflorum
Plants described in 1936
Flora of China
Flora of Russia